The General Electric Passport is a turbofan developed by GE Aviation for large business jets.

It was selected in 2010 to power the Bombardier Global 7500/8000, first run on June 24, 2013, and first flown in 2015.
It was certified in April 2016 and powered the Global 7500 first flight on November 4, 2016, before its 2018 introduction.

It produces  of thrust, a range previously covered by the General Electric CF34.
A smaller scaled CFM LEAP, it is a twin-spool axial engine with a 5.6:1 bypass ratio and a 45:1 overall pressure ratio and is noted for its large one-piece  fan 18-blade titanium blisk.

Development

GE's eCore research program developing a common architecture for business, narrowbody and regional jets resulted in the CFM LEAP succeeding the CFM56 aboard the Boeing 737 MAX and Airbus A320neo.
After a market study, GE pursued the long-range, large business jet and selected a  thrust to exploit technology acquired for its commercial and military engine programs.
Preliminary design work commenced in 2009.
The testing of the engineering cores began in 2010, with a second core set to be ready in 2011.
On May 16, 2011, the TechX was renamed the Passport.

In 2011 began rig testing of components including combustor and high-pressure turbines.
In 2012, to ensure containment by its shroud, a blade was blown off the fan.
By 2013, multiple complete engines builds commenced testing on GE's Peebles, Ohio, outdoor stands.
Bird ingestion and endurance were tested through 2014.
In 2015, the Passport first flew aboard GE's Boeing 747-100 flying testbed out of Victorville, California, as ice, water ingestion and altitude up to FL510 were tested in a U.S. facility in Tennessee.

In April 2016, it was FAA Certified after 3,380 hours and 3,385 cycles of testing.
The Global 7000 made its maiden flight with it on November 4, 2016.
It flew 100 hours on the Boeing 747 before logging more than 900 hours aboard the Global 7000 prototypes.
By May 2017, the engines had completed 3,100h in ground and flight test.

On 15 August 2017, the Global 7000 second prototype's right engine suffered an in-flight flameout at FL410, after “high vibration and high inter-turbine temperature readings”; subsequently, the airplane returned to Wichita Airport (290 km away) for a single engine landing.
It was traced to a mis-assembled part and a fleet-wide inspection revealed it was a one-off error.

In autumn 2017, GE was building the flight test engines for Bombardier while preparing for early manufacturing.
By service entry in 2018, 4,000 hours and 8,000 cycles of testing should be completed.

In 2021, General Electric tendered Passport to the USAF to be assessed in a contest between Rolls-Royce and Pratt & Whitney to reengine the B-52H Stratofortress. The contract was awarded to Rolls-Royce.

Design 

The engine is a twin-spool, axial-flow turbofan with a high bypass ratio of 5.6:1 and an overall pressure ratio of 45:1. The front fan is attached to the three-stage low-pressure compressor; the 23:1 pressure ratio 10-stage high-pressure compressor includes five blisk stages for weight reduction. The low-emission combustor has a case with integrated OGV diffuser for weight reduction. There is a two-stage high-pressure and four-stage low-pressure turbine. The engine and aircraft accessory drive extracts energy from the high-pressure, high-speed rotor. It is equipped with a dual-channel Full Authority Digital Engine Control (FADEC) control system, providing fault isolation and engine functionality and diagnostics capability.

A smaller scaled CFM LEAP, its HP compressor has five titanium blisks then five stages with insertable nickel alloy blades for higher temperatures.
Its bleed air cooled turbine blades are made of advanced alloys from the eCore program.
Blade tip active clearance control is modulated with cooling air from an enclosing manifold to the case, controlling its expansion and contraction depending on the flight envelope.

The  fan blisk, the first application of such technology on an engine this size, eliminates the need to balance a hub and blade system.
Blisk fans are usually found in small GE Honda HF120 or Williams International turbofans but the Passport titanium blisk is larger than the GE90 first stage compressor blisk.
The 18 highly twisted wide chord forged titanium blades are friction welded by translations to the hub.
The one piece fan reduces the vibration for cabin comfort, lowers wear and maintenance due to fewer parts, is lighter by a third and improves performance with less leaks and a smaller hub.
Fuselage-mounted business jet engines are high off the ground and shielded by the wing from most foreign object damage.
Its blades are more damage-resistant by being thicker at the leading edges due to their great efficiency.
The fan can be changed on-wing as a LRU to be evaluated for repair in the shop.

Its core cowling, exhaust cone and mixer are made in ox-ox composites, with inorganic high-temperature-tolerant resins and oxide ceramics CMCs to withstand 1,000 °C without deformation, saving weight and allowing complex molding.
The carbon fiber composite fan cowl can contain a separated fan blade.
GE provides the whole nacelle including the thrust reverser.
Developed with Safran, the slimline nacelle with clam-shell cowl openings reduce weight and drag.

Its TSFC is 8% lower than the competing BR725 of the Gulfstream 650, and over 10% better than the BR710.
GE's Strother Field plant in Arkansas City, Kansas, was the initial final assembly location. GE's plant in Lafayette, Indiana, is the current assembly site for the engine as of 2020.

Applications
 Bombardier Global 7500/8000

Specifications (Passport 20)

See also

References

External links
 
 

High-bypass turbofan engines
2010s turbofan engines
Passport